Relja Bašić (14 February 1930 – 7 April 2017) was a Croatian actor. With a career that lasted more than half a century, he is considered one of the most prolific performers of that country.

Biography 
Bašić was born on 14 February 1930 in Zagreb, at the time of Kingdom of Yugoslavia. He was born to a Jewish mother Elly (née Lerch) Bašić. Bašić was raised by his mother and stepfather Mladen Bašić. He first appeared on screen in 1954 classic film Koncert. Through the decades, he played many different roles in many different films, often in international co-productions. He never became a star, but remained one of the most recognisable and dependable character actors. His specialty were the roles of suave aristocratic villains, especially in historic films dealing with World War II, but his best remembered role is Mr. Fulir in 1970 cult musical comedy Tko pjeva zlo ne misli.

In the 1990s, Bašić was an enthusiastic supporter of the Croatian Social Liberal Party. During 1992 parliamentary elections he appeared as that party's candidate in one of Zagreb constituencies. He lost that race to Nedjeljko Mihanović of HDZ in controversial circumstances. A few months later, on elections for upper house of the Croatian Parliament, he won the seat representing City of Zagreb.

In 1995, President Tuđman awarded him with the Order of Danica Hrvatska.

Bašić also acted as a UNESCO Artist for Peace.

Bašić, several years earlier from his death, suffered from a femur fracture and as a result it restrained his movement. He died on 7 April 2017 in Zagreb.

Filmography

References

Bibliography

External links
 
 
 Bašić's best remembered role is Mr. Fulir in 1970 cult musical comedy Tko pjeva zlo ne misli (One Song a Day Takes Mischief Away)
 Bašić died at the age of 88

1930 births
2017 deaths
Male actors from Zagreb
Croatian male actors
Jewish Croatian male actors
Croatian Theatre Award winners
Croatian actor-politicians
Croatian Social Liberal Party politicians
Representatives in the modern Croatian Parliament
Golden Arena winners
Croatian Jews
Burials at Mirogoj Cemetery